Brandon Lavar Flowers (born February 18, 1986) is a former American football cornerback. He played college football at Virginia Tech, and was drafted by the Kansas City Chiefs in the second round of the 2008 NFL Draft.

High school career
Flowers played high school football while attending Atlantic Community High School, where he earned first-team all-area and all-conference honors. He was teammates with Omar Jacobs and David Clowney. Flowers then attended Hargrave Military Academy for prep school in 2003. At Hargreaves, he was teammates with Jonathan Hefney, Brian Soi, DJ Ware, and Justin Harper. He also starred in basketball and track.

Although considered a three-star recruit, Flowers was not listed among the nation's top cornerback prospects by Rivals.com.

College career
Flowers attended Virginia Tech, where he majored in Sociology. In 2004; he did not play in the season opener vs. Southern California, but made a spectacular interception for a 38-yard return the following week vs. Western Michigan. He suffered a fractured right fibula later in the contest and missed the rest of the season. Flowers returned to action in 2005, posting 20 tackles (13 solo) with four pass deflections, 1 1/2 stops behind the line of scrimmage, and an interception.

As a sophomore in 2006, Flowers took over the boundary cornerback spot, going on to start his final 27 games with the Hokies. He earned All-American second-team and All-Atlantic Coast Conference first-team honors, leading the league with 21 passes defended, breaking up 18 throws and picking off three others. He totaled 51 tackles (29 solo) with 3.5 sacks and 7.5 stops for losses. He also caused a fumble and did not allow an opponent to catch any passes in three games.

As a junior in 2007, Flowers again received All-American and All-ACC recognition. In 2007, Flowers intercepted five passes and deflected nine others; he also ranked third on the team with 86 tackles (56 solo), including eight stops behind the line of scrimmage.

In 41 games at Virginia Tech, Flowers made 28 starts at cornerback, making 158 tackles (99 solo) with 3.5 sacks for minus-28 yards, 17 stops for losses of 71 yards and six quarterback pressures. He caused and recovered a fumble, deflected 32 passes, and intercepted 10 others for 172 yards in returns and two touchdowns. He also led the Atlantic Coast Conference in passes broken up (18) and passes defended (21).

Flowers decided to forgo his final year of eligibility to enter the 2008 NFL Draft.

Professional career
Regarded as the No. 8 cornerback available in the 2008 NFL Draft, Flowers was described an "opportunistic cornerback with solid ball skills" by Sports Illustrated. He was drafted by the Kansas City Chiefs in the second round (35th overall) of the 2008 NFL Draft. Flowers was the highest selected Hokies defender since DeAngelo Hall in 2004.

Kansas City Chiefs

Flowers signed his contract for four years on July 23, 2008.

During the 2008 season, Flowers played opposite Patrick Surtain, who is his cousin.  He recorded his first two career interceptions against Brett Favre of the New York Jets on October 26, returning the 2nd one 91 yards for a touchdown. The Chiefs, however, lost the game 28–24.
Flowers finished the season with 69 tackles (62 solo), 1 forced fumble, 13 pass break-ups, 2 interceptions and a touchdown.

Despite playing nearly all the 2009 season with a hurt shoulder, Flowers accumulated 65 tackles (58 solo), 2 forced fumbles, 23 pass break-ups, and 5 interceptions.

During the 2010 season, he helped lead the Chiefs to the 14th ranked defense (in yards per game), after finishing 30th the previous season, and helped lead the Chiefs to their first division title since 2003. He finished the season with 65 tackles, 14 pass deflections, and 2 interceptions one of which was returned for a touchdown.

On September 16, 2011, Flowers signed a five-year contract extension with the Chiefs worth $50 million with $22 million guaranteed. In the Chiefs/Raiders game, Flowers picked the ball off twice, one of which was returned for a touchdown. Flowers finished the season with 59 tackles and 4 interceptions.

On June 13, 2014, the Chiefs released Flowers.

San Diego Chargers

On June 24, 2014, Flowers signed a one-year deal with the San Diego Chargers. His decision was influenced by the opportunity to play against the Chiefs. On September 28, 2014, against the Jacksonville Jaguars, Flowers picked off Blake Bortles, his first interception as a Charger. On October 5, 2014, versus the New York Jets, Flowers recorded his second interception of the season, intercepting Geno Smith. On November 23, versus the St. Louis Rams, Flowers recorded his 3rd interception of the season, intercepting Shaun Hill. Flowers finished his first season in San Diego recording 52 total tackles (48 solo), going along with 3 interceptions, and 10 passes defended in 14 games played.

Flowers re-signed with the Chargers on a four-year, $36 million contract on March 8, 2015. After the departure of Ryan Mathews he announced that he would switch his number to 24 (His previous number was 26). On December 12, 2015, he was placed on injured reserve.

Flowers appeared in six games in 2016 before suffering a concussion in Week 10. He was placed on injured reserve on December 14, 2016.

On March 7, 2017, Flowers was released by the Chargers.

Retirement
On August 8, 2017, Flowers announced his retirement from the NFL.

NFL career statistics

Personal life
Flowers posed for PETA's anti-fur campaign in December 2014 and became vegan in June 2015.

References

External links

1986 births
Living people
Sportspeople from Delray Beach, Florida
Players of American football from Florida
American football cornerbacks
Virginia Tech Hokies football players
Kansas City Chiefs players
San Diego Chargers players
Unconferenced Pro Bowl players
Los Angeles Chargers players
Hargrave Military Academy alumni